Oriomo-Bituri Rural LLG is a local-level government (LLG) of Western Province, Papua New Guinea. Eastern Trans-Fly languages (also known as Oriomo Plateau languages) are spoken in the LLG.

Wards
01. Dorogori
02. Wuroi
03. Wonie (Wipi language speakers)
04. Iamega (Wipi language speakers)
05. Wipim (Wipi language speakers)
06. Gamaeve (Wipi language speakers)
07. Tewara (Bitur language speakers)
08. Kapal (Wipi language speakers)
09. Upiara (Bitur language speakers)
10. Giringarede
11. U'ume (Wipi language speakers)
12. Masingara (Bine language speakers)
13. Kunini (Bine language speakers)
14. Iru'upi (Bine language speakers)
15. Waidoro (Gizrra language speakers)
16. Kulalai
17. Wamarong
18. Sebe (Bine language speakers)
19. Wim
20. Sogale (Bine language speakers)
21. Kurunti
22. Abam (Wipi language speakers)
23. Boze (Bine language speakers)
24. Bisuaka (Bitur language speakers; also the Giribam dialect of the Makayam language)
25. Podare (Wipi language speakers)

See also
Oriomo languages
Oriomo Plateau
Oriomo River

References

Local-level governments of Western Province (Papua New Guinea)